The Owyhee Desert ecoregion, within the deserts and xeric shrublands biome, is in the Northwestern United States. The Owyhee Uplands Byway passes through the desert.

Geography
An arid region of canyons, volcanic rock, sagebrush and grass makes up the ~ Owyhee Desert.

The desert is in northern Nevada, southwestern Idaho and southeastern Oregon. It is located on the south edge of the Columbia Plateau southwest of Boise, Idaho, stretching east from the Santa Rosa Range. The Owyhee Desert is primarily drained by the tributaries of the Bruneau River and Owyhee Rivers, which then flow into the Snake River.

Management
Most of the land in the desert is owned by the federal government and managed by the Bureau of Land Management. It is largely used as ranch land.

In 1999, the Desert Group submitted an alternative for Owyhee resource management.

See also

 Bruneau – Jarbidge Rivers Wilderness 
 Owyhee River Wilderness
 Y P Desert
 Northern Basin and Range (ecoregion)

References 

 
Deserts and xeric shrublands in the United States
Ecoregions of the United States
Northern Basin and Range ecoregion
Deserts of Idaho
Deserts of Oregon
Deserts of Nevada
Bureau of Land Management areas in Oregon
Geography of Malheur County, Oregon